The 601st Air Operations Center (601 AOC) is an active unit of the United States Air Force, assigned to the First Air Force and stationed at Tyndall Air Force Base, Florida. The unit plans, directs, and assesses air operations for the North American Aerospace Defense Command (NORAD), and the United States Northern Command (NORTHCOM), as the operations hub for First Air Force. It provides aerospace warning and control for NORAD Defensive Counter Air (DCA) activities. It also directs Air Force activities in support of NORTHCOM homeland security and civil support missions. The 601 AOC directs all air sovereignty activities for the continental United States.

The 601st Air & Space Operations Center was activated on 1 November 2007 at Tyndall. The DAF/A1M letter directing this action was dated 25 October 2007, and is almost certainly the date of the center's constitution. Other Air Operations Centers dropped the "space" from their name in late 2014. Simultaneous with the center's activation, the 701st Air Defense Squadron, 1st Information Operations Flight, and Air Forces Northern (First Air Force), Provisional, were all inactivated. They would appear to be the sources for the center's personnel and equipment.

Mission

The 601st Air and Space Operations Center provides strategic air defense/sovereignty, tactical warning/assessment to Commander NORAD and Combined Air Operations Center in support of homeland defense and security of the southeastern United States. The AOC also integrates ground, maritime, and airborne sensors/communications and employs fighter and air refueling aircraft. The organization also interfaces with other services/agencies including USSOUTHCOM, FAA, USCG, and U.S. Customs Service.

Units and partner organizations

101st Information Operations Flight 
The 101st Information Operations Flight (IOF) provides non-kinetic operational options to the Combined Forces Air Component Commander (CFACC). The flight provides homeland security air related missions, including support for Operation Noble Eagle. The 101st provides important inputs to the Air Tasking Orders executed by the Continental NORAD Region. The flight supports Integrated Air Defense Systems in the National Capital Region, National Security Special Events, Security Events for Homeland Security, and associated Combined and Joint Interagency Task Forces. Past activities include participation in relief activities after Hurricanes Katrina, Rita, and Wilma, major NORAD/USNORTHCOM and Canadian exercises, and operations to support the Super Bowl, Space Shuttle launch and recovery, G8 summit, UN General Assembly, and the Republican/Democratic National Conventions.

Joint Based Expeditionary Connectivity Center
The Joint Based Expeditionary Connectivity Center (JBECC) is a highly mobile, small footprint, vehicle-mounted set of communications equipment that can rapidly deploy to build an integrated air picture, from multiple Federal Aviation Administration and tactical radars, within a defined geographical area. This capability enabled NORAD to better detect, track, identify, and engage any airborne aircraft, cruise missile, unmanned aerial vehicle, or remotely piloted vehicle. 

It was developed in early 2001 as part of the Deputy Undersecretary of Defense for Advanced Systems and Concepts Advanced Concept Technology Demonstration program. Since September 11, 2001, the JBECC has participated in over a dozen operational missions, to protect the President of the United States, the National Capital Region, the 2004 Group of Eight (G8) Summit, United Nations General Assembly, Space Shuttle Launches, and Super Bowl XLI. It was a key component of NORAD's Deployable-Homeland Air and Cruise Missile Defense Mission.

Air Force Rescue Coordination Center 
As the United States inland search and rescue (SAR) mission coordinator, the Air Force Rescue Coordination Center (AFRCC) serves as the single agency responsible for coordinating life saving federal SAR services, ensuring timely and effective lifesaving operations within the 48 contiguous United States and supporting Mexican and Canadian requests for their SAR operations. The unit’s responsibilities include: initiating searches for missing/overdue aircraft (e.g., all DoD, commercial, and interstate aircraft or intrastate aircraft if requested by the state), managing all inland emergency beacon searches, and supporting state and local SAR operations (e.g., missing person searches, MEDEVAC, organ transport, etc.) The AFRCC operates 24 hours a day, seven days a week and is staffed by one watch supervisor and up to four SAR controllers.

References

External links
 1st Air Force
 601st AOC Twitter Page
 601st AOC YouTube Page

Air Operations Centers of the United States Air Force
Military units and formations established in 2007